is a Japanese multimedia project produced as a collaboration between ASCII Media Works' Dengeki Bunko imprint and video game company Sega. The project re-imagines various Sega video game consoles as anthropomorphized goddesses who appear all over modern Japan. The project has inspired a light novel series written by Tōru Shiwasu with illustrations by Kei, which was serialized in ASCII Media Works' Dengeki Bunko Magazine between 2013 and 2014, and an anime television series adaptation titled  by TMS Entertainment, which aired in Japan between October and December 2014. A crossover video game with Idea Factory's Hyperdimension Neptunia franchise, Superdimension Neptune VS Sega Hard Girls, was released for the PlayStation Vita in Japan in November 2015, and in North America and Europe in October 2016.

Premise
The project focuses on various anthropomorphised Sega consoles, known as "Sega Hard Girls" or "SeHa Girls" for short, each with their own unique personalities. The anime series follows three such girls; Dreamcast, Sega Saturn, and Mega Drive, who must graduate from Sehagaga Academy, a special school located in Haneda, Tokyo, by venturing into the worlds of various Sega games and earning medals.

Characters

 A pink-haired cheerful girl who wants to make friends with everyone and to excel in school. She wears a white and orange dress with a Dreamcast controller as her headgear, and can also access the internet using a dial-up modem.

 A black-haired serious girl seeking to accomplish great things in life who is the object of several male Sega characters' affections. She wears a silver coat with black dress and a huge black ring hanging on her neck.

 A blonde-haired cool and genius girl who knows everything, holding a wealth of knowledge in her 16-bit encyclopedia. She wears black and pink attire, large eyeglasses, and has a Mega Drive controller as her hairclip.

An upbeat girl who wears bunny ears and likes to perform magic tricks.

A silver haired girl who has a Master System controller on her sleeve. She has a talent for music.

A moody negative girl with multicolored hair. She tires easily and prefers to stay indoors, often leaving class early.

A small sports enthusiast. She has a split personality that changes based on whether she's playing baseball or tennis.

A blue-haired goddess who loves to talk.

A proud warrior.

A timid crybaby who carries a giant controller on her back.

A white-haired goddess.

A royal knight armed with sword and shield.

Mega Drive's little sister.

A sporty goddess who rides around on a hoverboard.

A fairy-like goddess who likes to tease others.

A self-obsessed American cowgirl. She prefers the nickname "Genny".

An intelligent and graceful goddess.

A teacher at Sehagaga Academy. He issues lessons to his students via a monitor and uses a pixelated rabbit, based on former Sega mascot Professor Asobin, as his avatar. His true identity is that of former Sega game designer and programmer Yuji Naka.

Media

Light novels
A light novel series, titled , was written by Tōru Shiwasu, with illustrations by Kei. It began serialization in ASCII Media Works' Dengeki Bunko Magazine on June 10, 2013. ASCII Media Works published the first volume on December 10, 2013 under Dengeki Bunko imprint while the second volume followed on June 10, 2014.

Manga
An anthology manga series, featured stories written and drawn by multiple creators. The series was serialized in Dengeki Maoh magazine in 2014, and was later compiled in a single tankōbon volume in February 2015.

Video games
The Sega Hard Girls version of Dreamcast makes a cameo appearance in Dengeki Bunko: Fighting Climax; the game's updated release, Dengeki Bunko: Fighting Climax Ignition, adds an additional stage based on Hi-sCoool! SeHa Girls. A crossover game with Compile Heart's Hyperdimension Neptunia series, titled , was released for PlayStation Vita in Japan on November 26, 2015 and later on released in North America on October 18, 2016 as well as Europe on October 21, 2016. A high-definition port of the game for Windows was released on June 12, 2017 via Steam.

Anime
An anime adaptation titled Hi-sCoool! SeHa Girls, which was produced by TMS Entertainment using the MikuMikuDance animation software and directed by Sōta Sugawara, aired in Japan between October 8 and December 24, 2014 on Animax and was simulcast by Crunchyroll. An additional OVA was released as part of the DVD box set on November 3, 2016. Sugawara also co-wrote the anime's screenplay with Masayuki Kibe. The CG character designs used in the anime were co-designed by Sugawara and Kio, who based the designs on Kei's original concepts. Shigeyuki Watanabe handled the CG direction. The opening theme is  sung by Dreamcast (Mao Ichimichi), Sega Saturn (Minami Takahashi) and Mega Drive (Shiori Izawa). The anime has been licensed in North America by Discotek Media, and was released via a Blu-ray and DVD combo pack on May 30, 2017; the OVA is not included in the North American release.

Episode list

References

External links
 

2013 Japanese novels
Animax original programming
Dengeki Bunko
Kadokawa Dwango franchises
Fantasy anime and manga
Light novels
Moe anthropomorphism
TMS Entertainment
Sega franchises
Works based on Sega video games
Discotek Media